Ludwig August Seeber (14 November 1793 in Karlsruhe – 9 December 1855 in Karlsruhe) was a German physicist.

From 1819 to 1822 he was teacher at the cadet school at Karlsruhe. Subsequently, he was professor ordinarius for physics at the University of Freiburg until 1834.  From 1834 to 1840, he was professor of physics at the Lyceum and Polytechnicum in Karlsruhe.

Seeber is known for his study of positive ternary quadratic forms in 1831, which was applauded by Carl Friedrich Gauss (1831) and later simplified by Peter Gustav Lejeune Dirichlet (1847).

References

Works 

1793 births
1855 deaths
19th-century German physicists
Academic staff of the University of Freiburg
Scientists from Karlsruhe